Josue Cartagena (born November 15, 1998) is an American soccer player who plays as a midfielder.

Career

Youth
Cartagena attended and played soccer at James Monroe High School.

College
Cartagena attended College of the Canyons in 2016 to play college soccer, going on to make 19 appearances for the Cougars, scoring two goals. Cartagena played his second year of eligibility at Taft College in 2018, where he played 23 goals and added two assists to his name. 2019 saw Cartagena transfer again, this time to California State University, Dominguez Hills, playing 30 games, scoring three goals and tallying a single assist in two seasons.

Professional
On January 25, 2022, Cartagena signed with USL League One club Chattanooga Red Wolves. He made his professional debut on April 2, 2022, appearing as an injury-time substitute in a 1–1 draw with Forward Madison. On March 15, 2023, Cartagena and Chattanooga mutually agreed to part ways.

References

External links
 Chattanooga Red Wolves profile

1998 births
Living people
American soccer players
Association football midfielders
Cal State Dominguez Hills Toros men's soccer players
Chattanooga Red Wolves SC players
People from North Hills, Los Angeles
Soccer players from California
USL League One players